John Buchanan (9 June 1928 – December 2000) was a Scottish football striker.

Buchanan started his career with Clyde, and his prolific form saw him get a move to Derby County. He also played for Bradford Park Avenue, before retiring in 1963.

He is only one of a handful of Clyde players to have scored four goals in a single match.

Derby County won the Third Division North title in 1956–57, but Buchanan only played six league games with a return of five goals.

Buchanan was  Bradford's leading scorer with 21 goals from 42 games (in 1960–61), as the team won promotion to the Third Division. He was also top scorer with 23 goals in 1958–59.

Buchanan received a Scotland B cap in 1952, when he played against a France B team in a 0-0 draw in Toulouse. In addition, he featured for a Scotland XI in an international trial match against the British Army in 1953.

Career statistics

Notes

Honours 

Clyde
 Scottish Division Two: 1951–52
 Supplementary Cup: 1951–52
 Glasgow Cup: 1951–52 
 Runner-up: 1949–50
 Glasgow Charity Cup: 1951–52

Derby County
 English Third Division North: Runner-up 1955–56

Bradford Park
 English Fourth Division: Promoted 1960–61

References

External links

1928 births
Scottish footballers
Clyde F.C. players
Derby County F.C. players
Bradford (Park Avenue) A.F.C. players
Scotland B international footballers
2000 deaths
Association football forwards
Scottish Football League players
English Football League players
Kilsyth Rangers F.C. players
Footballers from Falkirk (council area)